Peter Jaret Abbarno (born September 24, 1975) is an American attorney, businessman, and politician from Washington. He is a Republican member of Washington House of Representatives for District 20. Abbarno took office on January 11, 2021.

Education 
In 1997, Abbarno earned a Bachelor of Arts degree in Political Science from State University of New York at Fredonia. In 2008, Abbarno earned a Juris Doctor degree from Vermont Law School. In 2009, Abbarno earned a Master's degree in Laws in taxation from the University of Washington.

Career 
Abbarno was a deputy assistant prosecuting attorney in King County Juvenile Court. In 2010, Abbarno joined the law firm of Olson Althauser Samuelson and Rayan (aka Althauser Rayan Abbarno, LLP) in Centralia, Washington.

In 2015, Abbarno was elected to the Centralia City Council.

On November 3, 2020, Abbarno won the election and became a Republican member of Washington House of Representatives for District 20, Position 1. Abbarno defeated Timothy Zahn with 70.84% of the votes.

Awards 
 2019 Person of the Year. Presented by The Chronicle.
 2021 Legislator of the Year. Presented by The Washington Association of Agricultural Educators.

Personal life 
Abbarno's wife is Holly Abbarno. They have two children. Abbarno and his family live in Centralia, Washington.

References

External links 
 Peter Abbarno at ballotpedia.org
 Peter Abbarno at ourcampaigns.com
 Peter Abbarno at centralialaw.com

1975 births
Living people
21st-century American politicians
People from Centralia, Washington
Washington (state) lawyers
Republican Party members of the Washington House of Representatives